The Green Man is a Grade II listed public house at 57 Berwick Street, in London's Soho.

History
There has been a pub at this location since 1738. It was Grade II listed in 1978.

The pub regularly shows live sports and is known for being a good place to watch cricket matches in Central London.

Architecture
The current premises dates from the early 19th century. The building is constructed from yellow stock brick over three storeys, with a slate roof. A front on the ground floor with granite flanking pilasters was added in the early 20th century. Each of the floors have widely spaces windows with flat gauged arches.

The sign outside the pub depicts a caricature of Hercules with a green club, decorated with leaves.

References
Citations

Sources

External links
 
 Green Man – Pub Wiki

Pubs in Soho
Grade II listed pubs in the City of Westminster
1738 establishments in England